Corgatha subindicata is a species of moth of the family Erebidae. It was described by George Hamilton Kenrick in 1917 and is found in Madagascar.

It has a wingspan of approximately 28 mm.

See also
 List of moths of Madagascar

References

Moths described in 1917
Boletobiinae